Vexillum alfuricum is an extinct species of sea snail, a marine gastropod mollusk, in the family Costellariidae, the ribbed miters.

Distribution
Fossils of this marine species were found in Pliocene strata in Indonesia

References

 Fischer, P. J. (1927). Beitrag zur Kenntnis der Pliozän- fauna der Mollusken-Inseln Seran und Obi. Paläontologie von Timor, 15: 1–179, pls. 212-217 bis

External links

alfuricum
Gastropods described in 1927